Charles des Jamonières (18 April 1902 – 16 August 1970) was a French sport shooter who competed in the 1936 Summer Olympics, in the 1948 Summer Olympics, and in the 1956 Summer Olympics.

In 1936 he won the bronze medal in the 50 metre pistol event. He also participated in the 25 metre rapid fire pistol competition but was eliminated in the first round.

References

1902 births
1970 deaths
French male sport shooters
ISSF pistol shooters
Olympic shooters of France
Shooters at the 1936 Summer Olympics
Shooters at the 1948 Summer Olympics
Shooters at the 1956 Summer Olympics
Olympic bronze medalists for France
Olympic medalists in shooting
Medalists at the 1936 Summer Olympics